The County Museum of History and Art is a museum in Zalău, Romania, established in 1951.

Archaeologists from the museum took part in excavations in the region. In 2015, a stone sarcophagus was discovered during restoration of a sacred area at Porolissum. The find was unusual because the sarcophagus was not in the cemetery that had been previously excavated. The sarcophagus contains skeletal remains of a young peron, and the limestone lid has carvings that were common in Roman times. A hole in the lid suggests that the grave was robbed in antiquity.

References

Zalău
Museums in Sălaj County
Museums established in 1951
History museums in Romania
Art museums and galleries in Romania
Archaeological museums in Romania
1951 establishments in Romania